Iboguhé is a town in western Ivory Coast. It is a sub-prefecture of Issia Department in Haut-Sassandra Region, Sassandra-Marahoué District.

Iboguhé was a commune until March 2012, when it became one of 1126 communes nationwide that were abolished.

In 2014, the population of the sub-prefecture of Iboguhé was 41,768.

Villages
The 13 villages of the sub-prefecture of Iboguhé and their population in 2014 are:

Notes

Sub-prefectures of Haut-Sassandra
Former communes of Ivory Coast